The Dinner is a 2013 Dutch drama film written and directed by Menno Meyjes. It was screened in the Contemporary World Cinema section at the 2013 Toronto International Film Festival. The film is based on Herman Koch's novel Het diner.

Cast
 Thekla Reuten as Claire
 Kim van Kooten as Babette
 Daan Schuurmans as Serge
 Jacob Derwig as Paul
 Sabine Soetanto
 Reinout Bussemaker as Rector
 Gusta Geleynse as Dakloze
 Wil van der Meer as Tonio
 Jonas Smulders as Michel

See also 
The Dinner (2014)
The Dinner (2017)

References

External links
 

2013 films
2013 drama films
Dutch drama films
2010s Dutch-language films
Films based on Dutch novels